Clearwater Park is an unincorporated community in Alleghany County, Virginia, United States.

References
GNIS reference

Unincorporated communities in Virginia
Unincorporated communities in Alleghany County, Virginia